The Sarca is a river springing from the Adamello-Presanella mountains in the Italian Alps and flowing into Lake Garda at Torbole.

With its  length, it is the fifth largest river in Trentino after the Adige, Brenta , Noce  and Avisio , while it is the second for flow after Adige.

The river is shallow and fast flowing, passing through the Genova valley (Val di Genova), forming a number of waterfalls, of which Cascina Muta and Saft dei Can are the best known. Before reaching the Rendena Valley (Val Rendena), part of its water is diverted to a hydroelectric powerstation. Then its flow becomes less and less tumultuous. The main places on the river include Carisolo, Pinzolo, Tione di Trento, Le Sarche, Ponte Arche, Ragoli, Dro, Arco & Torbole.

Rivers of Trentino
Rivers of Italy